The East Branch of the Missisquoi River (Français: Branche Est de la rivière Missisquoi) is a tributary of the Missisquoi River, crossing the municipalities of Eden (Lamoille County) and Lowell, Vermont (Orleans County, Vermont, in the state of Vermont, in United States.

Most of the eastern branch of the Missisquoi River is accessible by route 100 (Vermont) which descends this valley; the lower part is served by route 58 (Vermont).

The surface of the East Branch of the Missisquoi River is usually frozen from mid-December to mid-March, except the rapids areas; however, safe circulation on the ice is generally from late December to early March.

Geography 
The eastern branch of the Missisquoi River takes its source on the mountainside on the northwest side of the Lowell Mountains whose summit reaches , in the municipality of Eden. This source of the river is located at:
  south of the village center of Lowell, Vermont;
  east of lac Champlain.

  towards the northwest by forming two curves towards the west and curving towards the north, up to route 100;
  north along more or less route 100, cutting Cheney Road and bending northeast at the end of the segment, until Ace Brook (coming from the south-east);
  northerly passing on the east side of Leland Hill and crossing the Lower Village Road, until route 58 (Hazen Notch Road), i.e. on the west side of the village center of Lowell;
  north-west along route 58, up to its mouth.

The East Branch of the Missisquoi River empties into a river elbow of the south-est shore of the Missisquoi River.

The mouth of the East Branch of the Missisquoi River is located at:
  north-west of the center of Lowell, Vermont;
  south of the Canada-US border;
  east of lake Champlain.

Toponymy 
The toponym "East Branch Missisquoi River" was registered on October 29, 1980 in the USGS (US Geological Survey).

References

External links 
 Level II scour analysis for bridge 9 (LOWETH00020009) on Town Highway 2, crossing the East Branch Missisquoi River, Lowell, Vermont

See also 

 Lamoille County
 Orleans County, Vermont
 Eden, Vermont, a municipality
 Lowell, Vermont, a municipality
 Burgess Branch, a stream
 Missisquoi River, a stream
 List of rivers of Vermont

Orleans County, Vermont
Lamoille County, Vermont
Rivers of Vermont